Hibbertia samaria is a species of flowering plant in the family Dilleniaceae and is endemic to Victoria, Australia. It is a small, low-lying or mat-forming shrub with hairy foliage, linear leaves and yellow flowers with ten to fifteen stamens arranged around three hairy carpels.

Description 

Taxonomy 
Hibbertia samaria was first formally described in 2013 by Hellmut R. Toelken in the Journal of the Adelaide Botanic Gardens from specimens collected near the Mount Samaria State Park in 1996. The specific epithet (samaria) refers to the Mount Samaria State Park, where several specimens were recorded.

Distribution and habitat 
This hibbertia grows in grassy forest, usually in rocky places near Mount Samaria and near branches of the Macalister River in central Victoria.

See also 
 List of Hibbertia species

References 

samaria
Flora of New South Wales
Plants described in 2013
Taxa named by Hellmut R. Toelken